Bruce Stavert is an Anglican prelate and the former Bishop of Quebec and Metropolitan of Canada. He served as bishop of Quebec from 1990 to 2004; and archbishop until 2009.

Born on 1 April 1940, he was educated at Trinity College in Toronto. He was ordained in 1964 and began his  career at Schefferville, Quebec.  He was a fellow and chaplain at his old college until 1976 and then the incumbent at St Clement's Mission East, St Paul's River in Quebec. He was chaplain at Bishop's University from 1981 to 1984; and then Dean of Saskatchewan until his elevation to the episcopate.

References

1940 births
Living people
20th-century Anglican Church of Canada bishops
21st-century Anglican archbishops
21st-century Anglican Church of Canada bishops
Anglican bishops of Quebec
Anglican Church of Canada deans
Metropolitans of Canada
Trinity College (Canada) alumni
Academic staff of the University of Toronto